Pseudohyaleucerea vulnerata is a moth of the subfamily Arctiinae. It was described by Arthur Gardiner Butler in 1875. It is found from Mexico to the Brazilian state of Espírito Santo.

References

Euchromiina
Moths described in 1875